Marc Andrew Newson  (born 20 October 1963) is an Australian industrial designer who works in product design, furniture design, aircraft cabin design, jewellery design, and clothing. His work is characterized by the use of smooth geometric lines, organic shapes, translucency, transparency, and the lack of sharp edges.

Career

Newson was born in Sydney, Australia, and in 1984 he graduated at the Sydney College of the Arts in Sydney, Australia studying jewellery and sculpture. In 1986 he was awarded a grant from the Australian Crafts Council and staged a first exhibition featuring the Lockheed Lounge. The following year he moved to Tokyo, where he mostly worked with the designer company Idée and where he created works such as the Super Guppy lamp (1987) and the Orgone lounge (1989). He moved to Paris in 1991 where he set up a studio. He describes his 1988 Embryo Chair as "one of the first pieces where I hit upon a discernible style".

He co-founded the Ikepod watch company in 1994, leaving the company in 2012. In 1997 he moved to London, where he and business partner Benjamin de Haan set up Marc Newson Ltd. He is currently adjunct professor in design at Sydney College of the Arts (where he first studied sculpture and jewellery) and is the creative director for Qantas. In 2005, he was selected as one of Time magazine's 100 most influential people of the year.

His work has become amongst the highest selling in auctions. One of his three Lockheed Lounge chairs sold for $968,000 at Sotheby's in 2006, and £1,100,000 at a 2009 auction at Phillips de Pury & Company. At the 2006 Design Miami fair he produced 12 Chop Top tables, all of which sold out in 20 minutes at an estimated $170,000. In April 2015 his Lockheed Lounge chair sold at auction for £UK2.4 million ($AU4.69 million), making it the most expensive object ever sold by a living designer.

Newson was appointed Commander of the Order of the British Empire (CBE) in the 2012 New Year Honours for services to design.

He was hired by Jony Ive and joined Apple as a senior vice president of design in September 2014.

In June 2019, it was reported that he will join LoveFrom, and independent design consultancy founded by Ive upon his departure from Apple.

Personal life

Newson was born in Sydney, Australia on 20 October 1963 to Paul Newson, an electrician and Carol. Carol was 19 years old when she was pregnant with Marc. She married Paul during the pregnancy, however Paul left the family soon after Marc was born. Carol moved back into her parents’ house to raise Marc. Marc's father figure came in the form of his grandfather, Andrew Rolfe, and his uncle, Stephen. Newson is of Greek origins on his mother's side.

Newson married Charlotte Stockdale, a fashion stylist, in 2008, and they have two children. They live in Bibury Court, a mansion in the Cotswolds that was converted from its previous use as a tourist hotel.They also have homes in London, Paris, and Greece.

Every year he races one of his four vintage sports cars – an Aston Martin, a Lamborghini, a Ferrari and a Cisitalia, in the Italian Mille Miglia while wearing bespoke tweed driving suits by H. Huntsman & Sons, and was quoted as saying: "I'm not a motor head, I don't like the new versions of any of those cars."

One of Newson's best friends is Sir Jonathan Ive of Apple Inc., whom he met in Japan. In a 2012 article in The New York Times, Ive described Newson's work:
I think Marc is fairly peerless now. Marc's forms are often imitated, but what other designers seldom imitate is his preoccupation with materials and processes. You have to start with an understanding of the material. Often your innovation is just coming up with a new way to use material.

In 2013, Ive and Newson collaborated on an auction at Sotheby's for Bono's Product Red charity. Over forty objects – "each of which we both like ... functional and capable of being made in volume", per Ive;  "deeply personal" per Newson – were curated, modified or designed over a two year period for the auction and show to benefit The Global Fund to Fight AIDS, Tuberculosis and Malaria. The auction raised $13 million  which was subsequently matched by The Bill and Melinda Gates Foundation, bringing the total raised to approximately $26 million.

Works

Newson’s work has been exhibited in both group exhibitions and in solo shows, with the most recent one being At Home, at the Philadelphia Museum of Art (2013). Objects he has designed include:

Furniture and products

 "LC1 Chaise Lounge" (1985 precursor to the Lockheed Lounge, with Eckhard Reissig)
 "Peanut chair" (designed in 1988 with Eckhard Reissig)
 "LC2 Lockheed Lounge" (designed in 1988–90 shortly after he graduated from school and one of the items that established Newson as a designer)
 Pod of drawers
 "Chop Top" table
 New range for Smeg (appliances) in 2009–2010
 Furniture for Cappellini
 Helice Floor Lamp for 
 Ikepod watches
 A collection of fittings and a sink for Ideal Standard in 2003
 The "Zvezdochka" shoe for Nike in 2004
 A Magnum Presentation Set for Dom Pérignon in 2006 and 2010 Black Box
 The "Scope" series of bags for Samsonite
 The "Atmos 561" and "Atoms 566" clocks for Jaeger-LeCoultre
 Cookware for Tefal
 Items for Alessi
 Drinking glasses for Iittala
 Clothes for the clothing company G-Star Raw
 Timepieces for freelance companies
 "Kelvin 40" concept plane for Fondation Cartier pour l'art contemporain 
 Pentax K-01 mirrorless interchangeable lens camera (2012)
Louis Vuitton Celebrating Monogram Backpack (2014)
 Caroma range of plumbing fixtures
 Apple Watch Sport, Apple Watch, Apple Watch Edition (2015)
 Decanter design for Hennessy's new Cognac, James Hennessy (2015)
 Montblanc M pen (2015)
 Louis Vuitton luggage (2016)
  Hourglass (2015)
 Newson Aluminium Chair for Knoll (2018)
 Swarovski Optik CL Curio 7x21 Binoculars (2021) 
 Newson Task Chair for Knoll (2022)

Transportation

 MN bicycles for Biomega (1999-2008) 
 Trek Art Bike for Lance Armstrong LiveStrong (2009)
 Ford 021C concept car for the Ford Motor Company in 1999
 Qantas International Skybed I (angled flat bed) and II (fully lie-flat bed) business class seat and Airbus A380 economy class seat, winner of the 2009 Australian International Design Award of the Year
 Cabin design for the Sky Jet (2007), an airline/rocket ship (by EADS Astrium) planning to take passengers into space from 2012.
 Riva Aquariva speedboat (announced in 2010, limited edition of 22 units)
 Qantas A330 business class suite in 2013
 Qantas premium economy seat

Weapons
 486 shotgun, Beretta, ducks foot (2014)
 "aikuchi" Samurai sword
 Sintered bronze and Damascus steel knife

Interiors, installations, and events
Newson designed the Qantas first class lounges in Melbourne and Sydney, as well as the invitation-only Chairman's Lounges.

In 1995 Newson designed Coast restaurant in London (in collaboration with architect Robert Grace).

He designed the Canteen restaurant in the early 2000s and the Lever House Restaurant & Bar in 2003 (in collaboration with the architect Sebastien Segers), both in New York.

In 2005 he designed the bar and the 6th floor of the Hotel Puerta America in Madrid, where each floor was designed by a world-renowned architect or designer.

He was selected as the artistic director for the 2011 Sydney New Year's Eve fire work display.

He has also designed homes for himself in Paris, London, the Cotswolds, and Greece.

Publications 
 by Cinzia Ferrara, Milano, Lupetti, 2005. 
Marc Newson: Works by Alison Castle, TASCHEN, 2012. ISBN 978-3-8365-0807-0

References

External links

 Marc Newson Ltd. homepage
 Marc Newson at Gagosian Gallery
 Design Museum: Marc Newson
 Marc Newson – Design Dictionary Illustrated article about Marc Newson (also containing a portrait photo of him)
 G-Star Raw's official website
 KDDI au: au design project > talby
 Ikepod Watch
 Various objects designed by Marc Newson from the collection of the Powerhouse Museum

1963 births
Living people
People from Sydney
Australian people of Greek descent
Australian Commanders of the Order of the British Empire
Royal Designers for Industry
Australian industrial designers
English industrial designers
Furniture designers
Industrial designers
Product designers
Designers